Goldbeater's skin is the processed outer membrane of the intestine of an animal, typically cattle, which is valued for its strength against tearing. The term derives from its traditional use as durable layers interleaved between sheets of gold stock during the process of making gold leaf by goldbeating, as a batch process producing many "leaves" at the same time. In the early modern production of airships, application of its high strength-to-weight ratio and reliability were crucial for building at least the largest examples.

Manufacture 

To manufacture goldbeater's skin, the gut of oxen (or other cattle) is soaked in a dilute solution of potassium hydroxide, washed, stretched, beaten flat and thin, and treated chemically to prevent putrefaction.

Up to 120 sheets of gold laminated with goldbeater's skin can be beaten at the same time, since the skin is thin and elastic and does not tear under heavy goldbeating. The resultant thickness of gold leaf can be as small as 1 μm-thick.

Applications 

 Goldbeater's skin is used as the sensitive element in hygrometers, since its hygroscopic behavior includes  contraction or expansion in response to atmospheric humidity.
 During the invention of the telephone, Alexander Graham Bell used a drum of goldbeater's skin with an armature of magnetised iron attached to its middle as a sound receiver.
 In 1754, Vatican priest Antonio Piaggio used goldbeater's skin in one of the earliest attempts to unscroll and read the Herculaneum papyri, ancient Greek texts buried and hardened into carbonized lumps by the 79 AD eruption of Mount Vesuvius.
 The North German Confederation printed 10- and 30-groschen postage stamps on goldbeater's skin to prevent reuse of these high-value stamps.
 Joseph Thomas Clover invented an apparatus for measuring the inhalation of chloroform in 1862; it included a large reservoir bag, lined with goldbeater's skin to make it airtight, into which a known volume of liquid chloroform was injected, while its contraction or expansion was monitored.
 Due to its transparency, strength, and fairly uniform thickness, goldbeater's skin is also used to repair holes and tears in manuscripts written on vellum.
 Large quantities of goldbeater's skin were used to make the gas bags of early balloons created by the Royal Engineers at Chatham, Kent starting in 1881–82 culminating in 1883 with The Heron, of 10,000 cu ft capacity.  The method of preparing and making gas-tight joins in the skins was known only to a family from Alsatia called Weinling who were employed by the RE for many years.  The British had a monopoly on the technique until around 1912 when the Germans adopted the material for the internal gas bags of the "zeppelin" rigid airships, exhausting the available supply: about 200,000 sheets were used for a typical World War I zeppelin, while the USS Shenandoah (ZR-1) needed 750,000 sheets. The sheets were joined together and folded into impermeable layers.
 Goldbeater's skin (sometimes also called "fish skin" in this context) is sometimes also used to seal oboe reeds to prevent them from leaking air.
 The goldbeater's skin test is used to assess the tanning properties of a compound.
 In the eighteenth and nineteenth centuries, goldbeater's skin  was also used as a material for condoms.

See also 

 Vark

References

Further reading 

 
 Fuchs, Robert (2004). "The History and Biology of Parchment". Karger Gazette. No. 67 "Skin" ( PDF).
 Roberts, Matt T., and Don Etherington (1982). "Goldbeater's skin". Bookbinding and the Conservation of Books: A Dictionary of Descriptive Terminology. Washington, D.C.: Library of Congress. p. 119. . .
 Thompson, Jack C. (1983). "Notes on the Manufacture of Goldbeater's Skin". Book and Paper Group Annual. Vol. 2. pp. 119–122.

Airship technology
Gilding
Hides (skin)